Eduardo Ivan Gajardo Meneses (born 1990) is a Chilean freestyle wrestler who competes at the 86 kg weight class.

Career 
Gajardo had been training judo since he was 8 years-old and later transitioned to wrestling when he was 17. 

He had his first international competition in at the Pan American Championships of 2011, in which he placed 11th. Since then, he has competed in multiple internationals tournaments and has collected multiple medals in competitions such as the South American Games and the Pan American Championships.

He won the silver medal in his event at the 2022 Bolivarian Games held in Valledupar, Colombia.

Major results

References

External links 
 

Living people
1990 births
Chilean male sport wrestlers
Wrestlers at the 2015 Pan American Games
South American Games medalists in wrestling
South American Games bronze medalists for Chile
Competitors at the 2014 South American Games
Competitors at the 2018 South American Games
Pan American Games competitors for Chile
People from Rancagua
20th-century Chilean people
21st-century Chilean people